Fencing at the 1990 Asian Games was held in Beijing, China from September 24 to October 4, 1990.

Medalists

Men

Women

Medal table

References
 New Straits Times, September 24 – October 5, 1990

External links
 www.ocasia.org

 
1990 Asian Games events
1990
Asian Games
1990 Asian Games